The  is a Bo-2-Bo wheel arrangement AC electric locomotive type operated on passenger and freight services in Japan since 1965, originally by Japanese National Railways (JNR), and later by Hokkaido Railway Company (JR Hokkaido), Kyushu Railway Company (JR Kyushu) and Japan Freight Railway Company (JR Freight). , just 10 locomotives remained in service, all operated by JR Freight.

Variants
 ED76-0
 ED76-500
 ED76-1000

ED76-0
94 class ED76-0 locomotives were built from 1965 to 1976 and numbered ED76 1 to ED76 94.

, the remaining fleet consists of two locomotives, ED76 81 and ED76 83, operated by JR Freight.

ED76-500
22 class ED76-500 locomotives were built from 1968 for use in Hokkaido, numbered ED76 501 to ED76 522. These locomotives included larger water and fuel tanks for the train heating steam generator and had accordingly longer bodies. They were intended to be used in pairs, and featured cab gangway doors.

ED76 514 was modified for used in the Seikan Tunnel and renumbered ED76 551.

All ED76-500s except for the unique ED76 551 were withdrawn by 1994. ED76 551 was withdrawn in 2001.

ED76-1000
23 class ED76-1000 locomotives were built from 1970 to 1979 for express freight use and numbered ED76 1001 to ED76 1023.

, the remaining fleet consists of eight locomotives, operated by JR Freight.

Preserved examples
The following examples have been preserved.
 ED76 1: Kyushu Railway Heritage Museum, (cab end only, previously stored inside JR Kyushu Kokura Works, Kitakyushu)
 ED76 91: Hita Tenryosui no Sato, Hita, Oita
 ED76 505: Mikasa Railway Village, Mikasa, Hokkaido
 ED76 509: Otaru Transport Museum, Otaru, Hokkaido
 ED76 1006: JR Freight Moji Depot (stored for training purposes)

Classification

The ED76 classification for this locomotive type is explained below.
 E: Electric locomotive
 D: Four driving axles
 7x: AC locomotive with maximum speed exceeding

References

20 kV AC locomotives
Electric locomotives of Japan
1067 mm gauge locomotives of Japan
Railway locomotives introduced in 1965
Toshiba locomotives
Hitachi locomotives
Mitsubishi locomotives
Kyushu Railway Company
Japan Freight Railway Company
B-2-B locomotives